The Transall Saga (also known as Blue Light) is a 1998 novel by Gary Paulsen. It is a survival story like most of his other books, but also involves the science fiction genre.

Premise

While hiking through the mountains, thirteen-year old Mark Harrison is brought to an alien world where he must survive the new terrain  and conflict with the planet's indigenous people.

References

1998 American novels
American children's novels
American science fiction novels
Children's science fiction novels
Post-apocalyptic novels
1998 children's books